Michael Wallace Banach (born November 19, 1962) is an American prelate of the Roman Catholic Church who has worked in the diplomatic service of the Holy See since 1994. He has been apostolic nuncio to Hungary since May 2022. He has served as an observer at a United Nations agency and as apostolic nuncio to several nations in Asia and Africa.

Biography 
Michael Wallace Banach was born on November 19, 1962, in Worcester, Massachusetts. He was ordained on July 2, 1988, by Bishop Timothy Harrington as a priest for the Diocese of Worcester. In 1992, Banach completed his preparation for a diplomatic career for the Holy See at the Pontifical Ecclesiastical Academy in Rome. He joined the diplomatic service of the Holy See on July 1, 1994, and fulfilled assignments in the nunciatures in Bolivia and Nigeria as well as in Rome in the Section for Relations with States of the Secretariat of State.

On January 22, 2007 Banach was appointed as permanent observer of the Holy See at the United Nations Office at Vienna and United Nations Industrial Development Organization and as permanent representative to the International Atomic Energy Agency and the Organization for Security and Co-operation in Europe in Vienna.

On February 22, 2013, Pope Benedict XVI named Banach titular archbishop of Memphis and gave him the title apostolic nuncio. On April 16, 2013, Pope Francis appointed him as apostolic nuncio to Papua New Guinea. Banach received his episcopal consecration from Cardinal Secretary of State Tarcisio Bertone on April 27, 2013, in Rome. His co-consecrators were Cardinals Marc Ouellet and Fernando Filoni. He was given additional titles over the next few years: on May 18, 2013, apostolic nuncio to the Solomon Islands; on March 19, 2016, apostolic nuncio to Senegal and apostolic delegate to Mauritania; 
on July 9, 2016, apostolic nuncio to Cabo Verde;
on August 22, 2016, apostolic nuncio to Guinea-Bissau.
On May 13, 2017, his title in Mauritania changed from apostolic delegate to apostolic nuncio.

On May 3, 2022, he was appointed apostolic nuncio to Hungary.

See also
 List of heads of the diplomatic missions of the Holy See

References

External links 

 

1962 births
Living people
21st-century American Roman Catholic titular bishops
Pontifical Ecclesiastical Academy alumni
Roman Catholic titular archbishops
Apostolic Nuncios to Papua New Guinea
Apostolic Nuncios to Senegal
Apostolic Nuncios to Mauritania
Apostolic Nuncios to Cape Verde
Apostolic Nuncios to Guinea-Bissau
Apostolic Nuncios to the Solomon Islands
Apostolic Nuncios to Hungary